Ooh Child is the fourth studio album by American-Australian singer Marcia Hines. Ooh Child peaked at No. 15 in Australia and produced the top ten single, "Something's Missing (In My Life)", which peaked at No. 9.
It was released digitally in 2020.

Track listing

Personnel
 Arrangements – Al Capps (tracks: A1 - 5, B2, B3), Jimmie Haskell (tracks: B1, B4), Robie Porter
 Arrangement of backing vocals – Mona Lisa Young, Robie Porter
 Arrangement of backing vocals and keyboards – Terry Young
 Bass – David Hungate, Mike Porcaro
 Conductor – Sid Sharp
 Drums – Ed Greene, Willie Ornelas
 Engineer – Jim Hilton
 Engineer assistant and mixdown – Linda Corbin
 Guitar – Bob Mack, Fred Tackett, Lee Ritenour, Paul Sabu, Rick Springfield, Tim May
 Guitar solos – Lee Ritenour
 Keyboards – Al Capps, Jai Winding
 Marimba and vibraphone – Julius Wechter
 Mastering – John Golden
 Percussion – Bob Conti, Carl Friberg, Robie Porter, Steve Forman
 Photography – Patrick Jones 
 Synthesizer programming – Jan Lucas

Charts

References

External links

1979 albums
Marcia Hines albums
Albums arranged by Jimmie Haskell